Daucher is a surname. Notable people with the surname include:

 Hans Daucher (1486–1538), German wood carver, sculptor, and medal designer
 Lynn Daucher (born 1946), American politician
 Marybeth Daucher, American biologist

See also
 Dauchez
 Gaucher